Dalyston was a railway station on the Wonthaggi railway line, in the Bass Coast area of Victoria. The station opened with the line and operated until the line's closure in 1978. A short distance beyond Dalyston a line branched off to Dudley Area, one of the many "mining branches" on the line. There is almost no trace left of the station. The Bass Coast Rail Trail now runs thought the site. 

Disused railway stations in Victoria (Australia)
Transport in Gippsland (region)
Bass Coast Shire